Yoriyuki is a masculine Japanese given name.

Possible writings
Yoriyuki can be written using different combinations of kanji characters. Here are some examples:

頼之, "rely, of"
頼行, "rely, to go"
頼幸, "rely, happiness"
依之, "to depend on, of"
依行, "to depend on, to go"
依幸, "to depend on, happiness"

The name can also be written in hiragana よりゆき or katakana ヨリユキ.

Notable people with the name

 (1714–1783), Japanese mathematician and daimyō
 (1329–1392), Japanese samurai
Yoriyuki Kuroda (黒田 和志, 1851—1917), Japanese aristocrat and politician
Yoriyuki Matsudaira (松平 頼之, 1858-1873), Japanese daimyo of the last Edo period

Japanese masculine given names